Pilsley is a village and civil parish in the district of North East Derbyshire in the county of Derbyshire, England. It is located near to the town of Chesterfield. At the 2011 Census the population was 3,487. 

Pilsley has an Anglican church, St Mary's, an evangelical Methodist church, two primary schools, a post office and a Kingdom Hall building for Jehovah's Witnesses. Pilsley also has a Village Hall and St Mary's Centre (formerly the church hall). Recently a new sports centre (The Elm Centre) was built for the school which is also available for community use. A section of the Midland Main Line (Nottingham to Chesterfield section) runs along the western edge of the village. A branch of the Great Central Railway ran through the village prior to the Beeching cuts of the 1960s, with a station sited on Station Road. The route of this former railway line now serves as a popular walking, cycling and horse riding trail known as the Five Pits Trail, linking Pilsley to Tibshelf, Holmewood, Grassmoor and beyond.

Pilsley has a Sunday league football team called Pilsley Miners Welfare Football Club. The team is currently part of the Chesterfield and District Sunday League.

The source of the River Rother is at Pilsley.

Although it is not possible to see Chesterfield from the residential part of upper Pilsley, the famous twisted spire of the Church of St Mary and All Saints in Chesterfield can be seen from part of Locko Road (near the junction with Dale View Road) in Lower Pilsley, and from two specific places in the Pilsley area.  Locko plantation (planted 1976) has a 15m wide strip without trees on the side facing Green Lane, this has been left clear to provide a view of the Chesterfield spire; however, it can only be seen from the top 20m of the plantation; it is most easily seen at night when the spire is floodlit.  The second place where the spire can be seen is on the Five Pits Trail, about 300m north of the Timber Lane car park; the spire can be seen along an 18m length of the path through a gap between a row of houses in the Highfields area of North Wingfield.

History 
Pilsley is mentioned in the Domesday Book as one of the manors belonging to Walter D'Aincourt.

Before 1800, Pilsley was an agricultural settlement and consisted of Upper Pilsley and Nether Pilsley. Few of the houses from that period still exist, these being some of on the corner of Station Road and Sitwell Grange Lane near the Primary School; others around Barlow Bank, Barlow Bank Farm and Grange Farm in Upper Pilsley near the site of the village well.
These houses are made from locally quarried coal-measure sandstone which is soft and contains a high percentage of iron. This quarry no longer exists, but was north of Upper Pilsley.

Pilsley Colliery was founded in 1866 on the site of the present day Locko Plantation. At its peak the colliery comprised six shafts, employed 945 men and produced 1,200 tons of coal per shift. The colliery was closed in 1957.
Pilsley consists of two distinct residential areas known as Lower Pilsley and Pilsley (sometimes Upper Pilsley). Lower Pilsley being the northern residential area and Pilsley being the southern residential area.

There is some local disagreement as to whether these two areas constitute two separate villages or one larger village. At the start of the village's life, people referred to the area around what is now Pilsley primary as Nether Pilsley. Both areas of the village are united by the same parish council, Pilsley Parish Council, which was formed on 30 January 1874; Pilsley having previously been part of the parish of North Wingfield. Maps show that the village is made up of four separate residential areas, which are, in order of their north to south alignment, Lower Pilsley, Upper Pilsley, Pilsley and Nether Pilsley.

See also
Listed buildings in Pilsley, North East Derbyshire

References

External links
St Mary's Church and Centre website, 2013
Pilsley Bowls Club, 2018
Pilsley Parish Council webpage, 2013

Villages in Derbyshire
Towns and villages of the Peak District
North East Derbyshire District